The Annobón lidless skink (Panaspis annobonensis) is a species of lidless skinks in the family Scincidae. The species is endemic to the island of Annobón in Equatorial Guinea and is listed as critically endangered by the IUCN. The species was first described as in 1972.

It is threatened by the loss of natural habitat and by the introduction of predatory species.

References

Further reading
 Fuhn, 1972 : Révision du Phylum forestier du genre Panaspis Cope (Reptilia, Scincidae, Lygosominae). Revue roumaine de Biologie, serie de Zoologie, vol. 17, no. 4, p. 257–271.

External links

Panaspis
Endemic fauna of Annobón
Reptiles of Equatorial Guinea
Reptiles described in 1972
Taxa named by Ion Eduard Fuhn